The Glorieuses or Glorioso Islands ( or officially also ) are a group of French islands and rocks totaling . They are controlled by France as part of the Scattered Islands in the Indian Ocean in the French Southern and Antarctic Lands, a French overseas territory, but are also claimed by Comoros, Madagascar and formerly by Seychelles. They are geographically part of the Comoro Islands between the French overseas region of Mayotte and the nation of Madagascar.

Archipelago

The archipelago consists of two islands, Grande Glorieuse and Île du Lys, as well as eight rock islets (Roches Vertes): Wreck Rock, South Rock and Verte Rocks and three other rocks that are unnamed. They form part of a coral reef and lagoon. It is thickly vegetated, mainly by the remains of a coconut plantation and casuarina trees.

It was formerly quarried for phosphate (guano).

Climate
In the ocean, migratory species such as humpback whales and whale sharks may appear.

History
While probably earlier known to Arab (perhaps especially Yemeni) navigators, the Glorieuses were named and settled in 1880 by a Frenchman, Hippolyte Caltaux, who established a coconut plantation on Grande Glorieuse. The archipelago became a French possession in 1892 when Captain Richard of the Primauget made a formal claim. In 1895, the Glorioso Island became a part of the colony of Mayotte and dependencies.

From 1914 to 1958, concessions to exploit the islands were given to Seychelles companies. The islands are today nature reserves with a meteorological station garrisoned by the French Foreign Legion. Despite the Glorioso Islands never having been a part of the Malagasy Protectorate but a part of the colony of Mayotte and dependencies, then a part of French Comoros, Madagascar has claimed sovereignty over the islands since 1972. The Comoros claims Mayotte and Glorioso Islands. The Seychelles claimed the islands too before the France–Seychelles Maritime Boundary Agreement in 2001.

In 2012, France founded Glorioso Islands Marine Natural Park, a marine protected area, to preserve the endangered flora and fauna of the islands.

Gallery

See also
France–Seychelles Maritime Boundary Agreement
Moheli Marine Park
Glorioso Islands Marine Natural Park

References

 
Indian Ocean atolls of France
Atolls of Seychelles
Atolls of the Comoros
Atolls of Madagascar
Disputed islands
Archipelagoes of the French Southern and Antarctic Lands
Territorial disputes of France
Territorial disputes of Madagascar
Territorial disputes of Seychelles
Territorial disputes of the Comoros
Comoros–France relations
France–Madagascar relations
France–Seychelles relations